Osangangan Obamakin was the 2nd Ooni of Ife, a paramount traditional ruler of Ile Ife, the ancestral home of the Yorubas. He succeeded Ooni Oduduwa and was succeeded by his son, Ooni Ogun.

References

Oonis of Ife
Yoruba history